The Kunsthalle Nürnberg is an art centre founded in 1967, near the city centre.  It organizes exhibitions by contemporary international artists in its galleries in Nuremberg. The Kunsthalle commissions new work by a majority of the artists it works with.

Solo exhibitions (selection):
 2017: Fearless Alicia Framis 
 2016: Scroll Down And Keep Scrolling Fiona Banner 
 2015: Warten auf Gegenwart II Alicja Kwade 
 2014: I tempi doppi Tatiana Trouve 
 2012: From Here to Eternity Susan Hiller
 2011: Silvia Bächli and Eric Hattan
 2010/2011: Mircea Cantor
 2010: Corinne Wasmuht, Karla Black, Mathilde ter Heijne
 2009/2010: Jürgen Teller

Group exhibitions (selection):
 2012: Goldrausch featuring works by Pawel Althamer, Felix Gonzalez-Torres, Filip Gilissen, Jonathan Monk, Claus Richter and others.
 2012: 30 Künstler / 30 Räume featuring works by Marc Camille Chaimowicz, Michael Beutler, Nairy Baghramian, Rosemarie Trockel, Tobias Rehberger and others.

References

External links
   

Modern art museums in Germany
Art museums and galleries in Germany
Museums in Nuremberg
Art galleries established in 1967
1967 establishments in West Germany